Heads of the Komi Republic is the highest official of the Komi Republic, an autonomous region of Russia. The position was introduced in 1994. In previous years, from the establishment of the multi-party system in 1990, the Supreme Council of the Komi Republic was the highest authority, and its chairman acted as head of state. In 2012, term of office was increased from four to five years.

List of the Heads 
Below is a list of the Heads of the Komi Republic:

Timeline

Election results

Last election 
Last election for the post was held on 13 September 2020.

2016 elections 
The 2016 elections were held on election day 18 September.

2014 elections 
The 2014 elections were held on election day 14 September.

2001 elections 
The 2001 elections were held on 16 December.

1997 elections 
The 1997 elections were held on 30 November.

1994 elections 
The 1994 elections were held on 8 May.

References

Sources
 Rulers.org
 From the history of elections of the Head of the Komi Republic

 
Politics of the Komi Republic
Komi Republic